Dermatobranchus caeruleomaculatus is a species of sea slug, a nudibranch, a marine gastropod mollusc in the family Arminidae.

Distribution
This species occurs in the Indo-Pacific region. It was described from Waterfall Bay, south side Tioman Island, east Malaysia. It is also known from Indonesia, the Philippines and Papua New Guinea.

References

Arminidae
Gastropods described in 2011